Doris Day (born Doris Mary Kappelhoff; April 3, 1922 – May 13, 2019) was an American actress, singer, and activist. She began her career as a big band singer in 1939, achieving commercial success in 1945 with two No. 1 recordings, "Sentimental Journey" and "My Dreams Are Getting Better All the Time" with Les Brown & His Band of Renown. She left Brown to embark on a solo career and recorded more than 650 songs from 1947 to 1967.

Day was one of the biggest film stars of the 1950s–1960s. Day's film career began during the Golden Age of Hollywood with the film Romance on the High Seas (1948). She starred in films of many genres, including musicals, comedies, dramas, and thrillers. She played the title role in Calamity Jane (1953) and starred in Alfred Hitchcock's The Man Who Knew Too Much (1956) with James Stewart. Her best-known films are those in which she co-starred with Rock Hudson, chief among them 1959's Pillow Talk, for which she was nominated for the Academy Award for Best Actress. She also worked with James Garner on both Move Over, Darling (1963) and The Thrill of It All (1963), and starred alongside Clark Gable, Cary Grant, James Cagney, David Niven, Ginger Rogers, Jack Lemmon, Frank Sinatra, Kirk Douglas, Lauren Bacall, and Rod Taylor in various movies. After ending her film career in 1968, only briefly removed from the height of her popularity, she starred in her own sitcom The Doris Day Show (1968–1973).

In 1989, she was awarded the Golden Globe Cecil B. DeMille Award for lifetime achievement in motion pictures. In 2004, she was awarded the Presidential Medal of Freedom. In 2008, she received the Grammy Lifetime Achievement Award as well as a Legend Award from the Society of Singers. In 2011, she was awarded the Los Angeles Film Critics Association's Career Achievement Award. The same year, she released her 29th studio album, My Heart, which contained new material and became a UK Top 10 album. , she was one of eight recording artists to have been the top box-office earner in the United States four times.

Early life

Day was born Doris Mary Kappelhoff on April 3, 1922 in Cincinnati, Ohio, the daughter of Alma Sophia (née Welz; 1895–1976) and William Joseph Kappelhoff (1892–1967). Her mother was a homemaker, and her father was a music teacher and choirmaster. Doris was named after actress Doris Kenyon. Her maternal and paternal grandparents were German; her paternal grandfather Franz Joseph Wilhelm Kappelhoff immigrated to the United States in 1875 and settled in Cincinnati which had a large German community with its own churches, clubs, and German-language newspapers. For most of her life, Day stated she was born in 1924; it was not until her 95th birthday – when the Associated Press found her birth certificate, showing a 1922 date of birth – that she stated otherwise.

The youngest of three siblings, she had two older brothers: Richard (who died before her birth) and Paul, two to three years older. Due to her father's infidelity, her parents separated. She developed an early interest in dance, and in the mid-1930s formed a dance duo with Jerry Doherty that performed in competitions throughout the United States. On October 13, 1937, while riding with friends, the car Day was in collided with a freight train, breaking her right leg and curtailing her prospects as a professional dancer.

Career

Early career (1938–1947)

While recovering from her car accident, Kappelhoff started to sing along with the radio and discovered a talent she did not know she had. "During this long, boring period, I used to while away a lot of time listening to the radio, sometimes singing along with the likes of Benny Goodman, Duke Ellington, Tommy Dorsey, and Glenn Miller", she told A. E. Hotchner, one of Day's biographers. "But the one radio voice I listened to above others belonged to Ella Fitzgerald. There was a quality to her voice that fascinated me, and I'd sing along with her, trying to catch the subtle ways she shaded her voice, the casual yet clean way she sang the words."

Observing her daughter sing rekindled Alma's interest in show business, and she decided Doris must have singing lessons. She engaged a teacher, Grace Raine. After three lessons, Raine told Alma that young Doris had "tremendous potential"; Raine was so impressed that she gave Doris three lessons a week for the price of one. Years later, Day said that Raine had the biggest effect on her singing style and career.

During the eight months she was taking singing lessons, Kappelhoff had her first professional jobs as a vocalist, on the WLW radio program Carlin's Carnival, and in a local restaurant, Charlie Yee's Shanghai Inn. During her radio performances, she first caught the attention of Barney Rapp, who was looking for a female vocalist and asked if she would like to audition for the job. According to Rapp, he had auditioned about 200 singers when Kappelhoff got the job.

While working for Rapp in 1939, she adopted the stage surname "Day", at Rapp's suggestion. Rapp felt that "Kappelhoff" was too long for marquees, and he admired her rendition of the song "Day After Day". After working with Rapp, Day worked with bandleaders Jimmy James, Bob Crosby, and Les Brown. In 1941, Day appeared as a singer in three Soundies with the Les Brown band.

While working with Brown, Day recorded her first hit recording, "Sentimental Journey", released in early 1945. It soon became an anthem of the desire of World War II demobilizing troops to return home. The song continues to be associated with Day, and she re-recorded it on several occasions, including a version in her 1971 television special. During 1945–46, Day (as vocalist with the Les Brown Band) had six other top ten hits on the Billboard chart: "My Dreams Are Getting Better All the Time", Tain't Me", "Till The End of Time", "You Won't Be Satisfied (Until You Break My Heart)", "The Whole World is Singing My Song", and "I Got the Sun in the Mornin. Les Brown said, "As a singer Doris belongs in the company of Bing Crosby and Frank Sinatra."

Early film career (1948–1954)

While singing with the Les Brown band and for nearly two years on Bob Hope's weekly radio program, she toured extensively across the United States.

Her performance of the song "Embraceable You" impressed songwriter Jule Styne and his partner, Sammy Cahn, and they recommended her for a role in Romance on the High Seas (1948). Day was cast for the role after auditioning for director Michael Curtiz. She was shocked at being offered the role in the film, and admitted to Curtiz that she was a singer without acting experience. But he said he liked that "she was honest", not afraid to admit it, and he wanted someone who "looked like the All-American Girl". Day was the discovery of which Curtiz was proudest during his career.

The film provided her with a  hit recording as a soloist, "It's Magic", which followed by two months her first  hit ("Love Somebody" in 1948) recorded as a duet with Buddy Clark. Day recorded "Someone Like You", before the film My Dream Is Yours (1949), which featured the song. In 1950, U.S. servicemen in Korea voted her their favorite star.

She continued to make minor and frequently nostalgic period musicals such as On Moonlight Bay (1951), By the Light of the Silvery Moon (1953), and Tea For Two (1950) for Warner Brothers.

Her most commercially successful film for Warner was I'll See You in My Dreams (1951), which broke box-office records of 20 years. The film is a musical biography of lyricist Gus Kahn. It was Day's fourth film directed by Curtiz. Day appeared as the title character in the comedic western-themed musical, Calamity Jane (1953). A song from the film, "Secret Love", won the Academy Award for Best Original Song and became Day's fourth No. 1 hit single in the United States.

Between 1950 and 1953, the albums from six of her movie musicals charted in the Top 10, three of them at No. 1. After filming Lucky Me (1954) with Bob Cummings and Young at Heart (1955) with Frank Sinatra, Day chose not to renew her contract with Warner Brothers.

During this period, Day also had her own radio program, The Doris Day Show. It was broadcast on CBS in 1952–1953.

Breakthrough (1955–1958)

Having become primarily recognized as a musical-comedy actress, Day gradually took on more dramatic roles to broaden her range. Her dramatic star turn as singer Ruth Etting in Love Me or Leave Me (1955), with top billing above James Cagney, received critical and commercial success, becoming Day's biggest hit thus far. Cagney said she had "the ability to project the simple, direct statement of a simple, direct idea without cluttering it", comparing her to Laurette Taylor's Broadway performance in The Glass Menagerie (1945), one of the greatest performances by an American actor. Day said it was her best film performance. Producer Joe Pasternak said, "I was stunned that Doris did not get an Oscar nomination." The soundtrack album from that movie was a No. 1 hit.

Day starred in Alfred Hitchcock's suspense film The Man Who Knew Too Much (1956) with James Stewart. She sang two songs in the film, "Que Sera, Sera (Whatever Will Be, Will Be)" which won an Academy Award for Best Original Song, and "We'll Love Again". The film was Day's 10th movie to be in the Top 10 at the box office. Day played the title role in the thriller/noir Julie (also 1956) with Louis Jourdan.

After three successive dramatic films, Day returned to her musical/comedic roots in The Pajama Game (1957) with John Raitt. The film was based on the Broadway play of the same name. She worked with Paramount Pictures for the comedy Teacher's Pet (1958), alongside Clark Gable and Gig Young. She co-starred with Richard Widmark and Gig Young in the romantic comedy film The Tunnel of Love (also 1958), but found scant success opposite Jack Lemmon in It Happened to Jane (1959).

Billboard annual nationwide poll of disc jockeys had ranked Day as the No. 1 female vocalist nine times in ten years (1949 through 1958), but her success and popularity as a singer was now being overshadowed by her box-office appeal.

Box-office success (1959–1968)

In 1959, Day entered her most successful phase as a film actress with a series of romantic comedies. This success began with Pillow Talk (1959), co-starring Rock Hudson who became a lifelong friend, and Tony Randall. Day received a nomination for an Academy Award for Best Actress. It was the only Oscar nomination she received in her career. Day, Hudson, and Randall made two more films together, Lover Come Back (1961) and Send Me No Flowers (1964).

Along with David Niven and Janis Paige, Day starred in Please Don't Eat the Daisies (1960) and with Cary Grant in the comedy That Touch of Mink (1962). During 1960 and the 1962 to 1964 period, she ranked number one at the box office, the second woman to be number one four times, an accomplishment equalled by no other actress except Shirley Temple. She set a record that has yet to be equaled, receiving seven consecutive Laurel Awards as the top female box office star.

Day teamed up with James Garner starting with The Thrill of It All, followed by Move Over, Darling (both 1963). The film's theme song, "Move Over Darling", co-written by her son, reached  in the UK. In between these comedic roles, Day co-starred with Rex Harrison in the movie thriller Midnight Lace (1960), an updating of the stage thriller Gaslight.

By the late 1960s, the sexual revolution of the baby boomer generation had refocused public attitudes about sex. Times changed, but Day's films did not. Day's next film Do Not Disturb (1965) was popular with audiences, but her popularity soon waned. Critics and comics dubbed Day "The World's Oldest Virgin", and audiences began to shy away from her films. As a result, she slipped from the list of top box-office stars, last appearing in the top ten with the hit film The Glass Bottom Boat (1966). One of the roles she turned down was that of Mrs. Robinson in The Graduate, a role that eventually went to Anne Bancroft. In her published memoirs, Day said she had rejected the part on moral grounds: she found the script "vulgar and offensive".

She starred in the western film The Ballad of Josie (1967). That same year, Day recorded The Love Album, although it was not released until 1994. The following year (1968), she starred in the comedy film Where Were You When the Lights Went Out? which centers on the Northeast blackout of November 9, 1965. Her final feature, the comedy With Six You Get Eggroll, was released in 1968.

From 1959 to 1970, Day received nine Laurel Award nominations (and won four times) for best female performance in eight comedies and one drama. From 1959 through 1969, she received six Golden Globe nominations for best female performance in three comedies, one drama (Midnight Lace), one musical (Jumbo), and her television series.

Bankruptcy and television career

After her third husband Martin Melcher died on April 20, 1968, a shocked Day discovered that Melcher and his business partner and "adviser" Jerome Bernard Rosenthal had squandered her earnings, leaving her deeply in debt. Rosenthal had been her attorney since 1949, when he represented her in her uncontested divorce action against her second husband, saxophonist George W. Weidler. Day filed suit against Rosenthal in February 1969, won a successful decision in 1974, but did not receive compensation until a settlement in 1979.

Day also learned to her displeasure that Melcher had committed her to a television series, which became The Doris Day Show.

Day hated the idea of performing on television, but felt obligated to do it. The first episode of The Doris Day Show aired on September 24, 1968, and, from 1968 to 1973, employed a rerecorded version of "Que Sera, Sera" as its theme song. Day persevered (she needed the work to help pay off her debts), but only after CBS ceded creative control to her and her son. The successful show enjoyed a five-year run, and functioned as a curtain raiser for the Carol Burnett Show. It is remembered today for its abrupt season-to-season changes in casting and premise.

By the end of its run in 1973, public tastes had changed, as had those of the television industry, and her firmly established persona was regarded as passé. She largely retired from acting after The Doris Day Show, but did complete two television specials, The Doris Mary Anne Kappelhoff Special (1971) and Doris Day Today (1975), and was a guest on various shows in the 1970s.

In the 1985–86 season, Day hosted her own television talk show, Doris Day's Best Friends, on the Christian Broadcasting Network (CBN). The network canceled the show after 26 episodes, despite the worldwide publicity it received. Much of that attention came from the episode featuring Rock Hudson, in which Hudson was showing the first public symptoms of AIDS including severe weight loss and admitted fatigue; Hudson would die from the disease a year later. Day later said, "He was very sick. But I just brushed that off and I came out and put my arms around him and said, 'Am I glad to see you'."

1980s and 1990s
Day's husband and agent, Martin Melcher, had Beverly Hills lawyer Jerome Rosenthal handle his wife's money since the 1940s. "During that period, Rosenthal committed breaches of professional ethics that are difficult to exaggerate", as one court put it.

In October 1985, the California Supreme Court rejected Rosenthal's appeal of the multimillion-dollar judgment against him for legal malpractice, and upheld conclusions of a trial court and a Court of Appeal that Rosenthal acted improperly. In April 1986, the U.S. Supreme Court refused to review the lower court's judgment. In June 1987, Rosenthal filed a $30 million lawsuit against lawyers he claimed cheated him out of millions of dollars in real estate investments. He named Day as a co-defendant, describing her as an "unwilling, involuntary plaintiff whose consent cannot be obtained". Rosenthal claimed that millions of dollars Day lost were in real estate sold after Melcher died in 1968, in which Rosenthal asserted that the attorneys gave Day bad advice, telling her to sell, at a loss, three hotels, in Palo Alto, California, Dallas, Texas, and Atlanta, Georgia, plus some oil leases in Kentucky and Ohio. He claimed he had made the investments under a long-term plan, and did not intend to sell them until they appreciated in value. Two of the hotels sold in 1970 for about $7 million, and their estimated worth in 1986 was $50 million.

Terry Melcher stated that his adoptive father's premature death saved Day from financial ruin. It remains unresolved whether Martin Melcher had himself also been duped. Day stated publicly that she believed her husband innocent of any deliberate wrongdoing, stating that he "simply trusted the wrong person". According to Day's autobiography, as told to A. E. Hotchner, the usually athletic and healthy Martin Melcher had an enlarged heart. Most of the interviews on the subject given to Hotchner (and included in Day's autobiography) paint an unflattering portrait of Melcher. Author David Kaufman asserts that one of Day's costars, actor Louis Jourdan, maintained that Day herself disliked her husband, but Day's public statements regarding Melcher appear to contradict that assertion.

Day was scheduled to present, along with Patrick Swayze and Marvin Hamlisch, the Best Original Score Oscar at the 61st Academy Awards in March 1989 but she suffered a deep leg cut and was unable to attend. She had been walking through the gardens of her hotel when she cut her leg on a sprinkler. The cut required stitches.

Day was inducted into the Ohio Women's Hall of Fame in 1981 and received the Cecil B. DeMille Award for career achievement in 1989. In 1994, Day's Greatest Hits album became another entry into the British charts. Her cover of "Perhaps, Perhaps, Perhaps" was included in the soundtrack of the Australian film Strictly Ballroom.

2000s
Day participated in interviews and celebrations of her birthday with an annual Doris Day music marathon. In July 2008, she appeared on the Southern California radio show of longtime friend and newscaster George Putnam.

Day turned down a tribute offer from the American Film Institute and from the Kennedy Center Honors because they require attendance in person. In 2004, she was awarded the Presidential Medal of Freedom by President George W. Bush for her achievements in the entertainment industry and for her work on behalf of animals. President Bush stated:

Columnist Liz Smith and film critic Rex Reed mounted vigorous campaigns to gather support for an Academy Honorary Award for Day to herald her film career and her status as the top female box-office star of all time. According to The Hollywood Reporter in 2015, the Academy offered her the Honorary Oscar multiple times, but she declined as she saw the film industry as a part of her past life. Day received a Grammy for Lifetime Achievement in Music in 2008, albeit again in absentia.

She received three Grammy Hall of Fame Awards, in 1998, 1999 and 2012, for her recordings of "Sentimental Journey", "Secret Love", and "Que Sera, Sera", respectively. Day was inducted into the Hit Parade Hall of Fame in 2007, and in 2010 received the first Legend Award ever presented by the Society of Singers.

2010s
Day, aged 89, released My Heart in the United Kingdom on September 5, 2011, her first new album in nearly two decades since the release of The Love Album, which, although recorded in 1967, was not released until 1994. The album is a compilation of previously unreleased recordings produced by Day's son, Terry Melcher, before his death in 2004. Tracks include the 1970s Joe Cocker hit "You Are So Beautiful", the Beach Boys' "Disney Girls" and jazz standards such as "My Buddy", which Day originally sang in the film I'll See You in My Dreams (1951).

After the disc was released in the United States it soon climbed to No. 12 on Amazon's bestseller list, and helped raise funds for the Doris Day Animal League. Day became the oldest artist to score a UK Top 10 with an album featuring new material.

In January 2012, the Los Angeles Film Critics Association presented Day with a Lifetime Achievement Award.

In April 2014, Day made an unexpected public appearance to attend the annual Doris Day Animal Foundation benefit. The benefit raises money for her Animal Foundation.

Clint Eastwood offered Day a role in a film he was planning to direct in 2015. Although she reportedly was in talks with Eastwood, her neighbor in Carmel, about a role in the film, she eventually declined.

Day granted ABC a telephone interview on her birthday in 2016, which was accompanied by photos of her life and career.

In a rare interview with The Hollywood Reporter on April 4, 2019, the day after her 97th birthday, Day talked about her work on the Doris Day Animal Foundation, founded in 1978. On the question of what her favorite film was, she answered Calamity Jane: "I was such a tomboy growing up, and she was such a fun character to play. Of course, the music was wonderful, too—'Secret Love,' especially, is such a beautiful song."

To commemorate her birthday, her fans gathered each year to take part in a three-day party in her hometown of Carmel-by-the-Sea, California, in late March. The event was also a fundraiser for her Animal Foundation. During the 2019 event, there was a special screening of her film Pillow Talk (1959) to celebrate its 60th anniversary. About the film, Day stated in the same interview that she "had such fun working with my pal, Rock. We laughed our way through three films we made together and remained great friends. I miss him."

Animal welfare activism
It was during the making of The Man Who Knew Too Much, when she saw how camels, goats, and other "animal extras" in a marketplace scene were being treated, that Day began actively preventing animal abuse. She was so appalled at the conditions the animals used in filming were kept in that she refused to work unless they were properly fed and cared for. The production company had to set up "feeding stations" for the various goats, sheep, camels, etc., and feed them every day before Day would agree to go back to work.

In 1971, she co-founded Actors and Others for Animals, and appeared in a series of newspaper advertisements denouncing the wearing of fur, alongside Mary Tyler Moore, Angie Dickinson, and Jayne Meadows.

In 1978, Day founded the Doris Day Pet Foundation, now the Doris Day Animal Foundation (DDAF). A non-profit 501(c)(3) grant-giving public charity, DDAF funds other non-profit causes throughout the US that share DDAF's mission of helping animals and the people who love them. The DDAF continues to operate independently.

To complement the Doris Day Animal Foundation, Day formed the Doris Day Animal League (DDAL) in 1987, a national non-profit citizens' lobbying organization whose mission is to reduce pain and suffering, and protect animals through legislative initiatives. Day actively lobbied the United States Congress in support of legislation designed to safeguard animal welfare on a number of occasions, and in 1995 she originated the annual World Spay Day. The DDAL merged into the Humane Society of the United States (HSUS) in 2006. The HSUS now manages World Spay Day, the annual one-day spay/neuter event that Day originated.

A facility bearing her name, the Doris Day Horse Rescue and Adoption Center, which helps abused and neglected horses, opened in 2011 in Murchison, Texas, on the grounds of an animal sanctuary started by her late friend, author Cleveland Amory. Day contributed $250,000 toward the founding of the center.

A posthumous auction of 1,100 of Day's possessions in April 2020 generated $3 million for the Doris Day Animal Foundation.

Personal life
After her retirement from films, Day lived in Carmel-by-the-Sea, California. She had many pets and adopted stray animals. She was a lifelong Republican. Her only child was music producer and songwriter Terry Melcher, who had a hit in the 1960s with "Hey Little Cobra" under the name The Rip Chords before becoming a successful producer whose acts included The Byrds, Paul Revere & the Raiders, and The Beach Boys; he died of melanoma in November 2004. Since the 1980s Day owned a hotel in Carmel-by-the-Sea called the Cypress Inn which she originally co-owned with her son. It was an early pet–friendly hotel and was featured in Architectural Digest in 1999.

Marriages
Day was married four times. From April 1941 to February 1943, she was married to trombonist Al Jorden (1917–1967), whom she met in Barney Rapp's Band. Jorden had schizophrenia and was violent, and died by suicide. When Day became pregnant and refused to have an abortion, he beat her in an attempt to force a miscarriage. Their son, Terrence "Terry" Paul Jorden, was born in 1942; his name was changed to Terrence Paul Melcher when he was adopted by Day's third husband.

Her second marriage was to George William Weidler (1926–1989), a saxophonist and brother of actress Virginia Weidler, from March 30, 1946, to May 31, 1949. Weidler and Day met again several years later during a brief reconciliation, and he introduced her to Christian Science.

Day married American film producer Martin Melcher (1915–1968) on April 3, 1951, her 29th birthday, and this marriage lasted until he died in April 1968. Melcher adopted Day's son Terry, who became a successful musician and record producer under the name Terry Melcher. Martin Melcher produced many of Day's movies. They were both Christian Scientists, resulting in her not seeing a doctor for some time for symptoms which suggested cancer. Following Melcher's death, Day separated from the Church of Christ, Scientist and grew close to charismatic Protestants such as Kathryn Kuhlman, although she never lost interest in Christian Science teaching and practice.

Day's fourth marriage was to Barry Comden (1935–2009) from April 14, 1976, until April 2, 1982. He was the maître d'hôtel at one of Day's favorite restaurants. He knew of her great love of dogs and endeared himself to her by giving her a bag of meat scraps and bones on her way out of the restaurant. He later complained that she cared more for her "animal friends" than she did for him.

Death
Day died at her home in Carmel Valley, California, on May 13, 2019, at the age of 97, after having contracted pneumonia. Her death was announced by her charity, the Doris Day Animal Foundation. Per Day's requests, the Foundation announced that there would be no funeral services, grave marker, or other public memorials.

Filmography

Discography

Studio albums

 You're My Thrill (1949)
 Young Man with a Horn (1950)
 Tea for Two (1950)
 Lullaby of Broadway (1951)
 On Moonlight Bay (1951)
 I'll See You in My Dreams (1951)
 By the Light of the Silvery Moon (1953)
 Calamity Jane (1953)
 Young at Heart (1954)
 Love Me or Leave Me (1955)
 Day Dreams (1955)
 Day by Day (1956)
 The Pajama Game (1957)
 Day by Night (1957)
 Hooray for Hollywood (1958)
 Cuttin' Capers (1959)
 What Every Girl Should Know (1960)
 Show Time (1960)
 Listen to Day (1960)
 Bright and Shiny (1961)
 I Have Dreamed (1961)
 Duet (1962)
 You'll Never Walk Alone (1962)
 Billy Rose's Jumbo (1962)
 Annie Get Your Gun (1963)
 Love Him (1963)
 The Doris Day Christmas Album (1964)
 With a Smile and a Song (1964)
 Latin for Lovers (1965)
 Doris Day's Sentimental Journey (1965)
 The Love Album (recorded 1967; released in 1994)
 My Heart (with 8 previously unissued tracks recorded in 1985; released in 2011)

Source

See also
 List of awards and nominations received by Doris Day

References

Sources
Barothy, Mary Anne (2007), Day at a Time: An Indiana Girl's Sentimental Journey to Doris Day's Hollywood and Beyond. Hawthorne Publishing, 

Bret, David (2008), Doris Day: Reluctant Star. JR Books, London, 
 Brogan, Paul E. (2011), Was That a Name I Dropped?, Aberdeen Bay; 

.

 Patrick, Pierre; McGee, Garry (2009), The Doris Day Companion: A Beautiful Day. BearManor Media,

External links

Day Animal Foundation

 
1922 births
2019 deaths
20th-century American actresses
20th-century American singers
20th-century American women singers
21st-century American singers
21st-century American women singers
Actresses from Cincinnati
Age controversies
American Christian Scientists
American film actresses
American memoirists
American people of German descent
American television actresses
American television talk show hosts
American women memoirists
American women pop singers
American animal welfare workers
Arwin Records artists
Big band singers
California Republicans
Cecil B. DeMille Award Golden Globe winners
Columbia Records artists
Converts to Christian Science
Deaths from pneumonia in California
Grammy Lifetime Achievement Award winners
Musicians from Cincinnati
People from Carmel-by-the-Sea, California
Presidential Medal of Freedom recipients
Singers from California
Singers from Ohio
Traditional pop music singers
Metro-Goldwyn-Mayer contract players
Universal Pictures contract players
Warner Bros. contract players